Shirty may mean:

 Aggressive or bad-tempered, in British and Australian English. Example: "I have developed an elevated shirty disposition due to the construction noise below my office." 
 Shirty: The Slightly Aggressive Bear, a popular character from Australian TV series The Late Show